is a Malaysian rugby union player who plays as a Lock. He currently plays for Chicago Hounds (rugby union) in America's domestic Major League Rugby. He had previously represented Hino Red Dolphins.

References

External links
 

1988 births
Living people
Malaysian expatriates in Japan
Malaysian rugby union players
Rugby union locks
Shizuoka Blue Revs players
Rugby union players at the 2010 Asian Games
Rugby union players at the 2014 Asian Games
Hino Red Dolphins players
Chicago Hounds (rugby union) players